Venlo is a city and municipality in the southeastern Netherlands, close to the border with Germany. It is situated in the province of Limburg. The municipality of Venlo counted 101,578 inhabitants as of January 2019.

History

Early history 

Roman and Celtic coins have been found in Venlo; it was speculated to have been the settlement known as Sablones on the Roman road connecting Maastricht with Xanten, but the little evidence there is concerning the location of Sablones speaks against this thought while there is no evidence in support of it. Blerick, on the west bank, was known as Blariacum.

Documents from the 9th century mention Venlo as a trade post; it developed into one of the more important ones in the Meuse-Rhine area, receiving city rights in 1343, and becoming a member of the Hanseatic League in 1375.
 
Because of its strategic importance, the city of Venlo was besieged several times. The most significant siege was that of 1702, carried on by Menno van Coehoorn. Consequently, Venlo was incorporated into the Generaliteitslanden of the United Provinces at the Treaty of 1713. After the Napoleonic Wars it became part of the United Kingdom of the Netherlands.

In 1839-1866 Venlo was not a part of German Confederation, completely surrounded by its territory.

World War II 
On 9 November 1939, two British Intelligence Service agents were kidnapped by the Sicherheitsdienst in what became known as the Venlo Incident. The incident was used by the Nazis to link Great Britain to Georg Elser's failed assassination of Hitler at the Bürgerbräukeller the day before and to justify their later invasion of the Netherlands, a neutral country, on 10 May 1940.

Venlo had both a road and a railway bridge over the Meuse. The city was severely damaged by bombing raids (13 October – 19 November 1944) on the bridges at the end of the war. Allied forces made 13 attempts to destroy the bridges to cut the German supply lines and block a retreat of the German army across the river. These failed, and it was the retreating German troops who in the end blew up the bridges in an attempt to stop the allied advance. Allied forces liberated Venlo from the east, from inside Germany itself.

About 300 people were killed due to those raids. The raids also cost Venlo a major part of its historical buildings. However, some old buildings, such as the city hall (the 'Stadhuis') and the 'Römer' house, survived the war relatively unscathed.

Before the war, Venlo had a small Jewish community.  In 1930 there were 86 Jewish people living in Venlo. In the next decade this number rose to about 248, because German Jews were trying to evade the discriminatory laws and growing hate in Germany. 6 years after the end of The Holocaust and the first wave of Jewish immigration to Israel there were 32 Jewish people left in Venlo.

Post-Second World War era 

By the late 1990s, drug-related nuisance had become a problem in the centre of Venlo. National and municipal officials launched the Q-4 Project and Tango initiatives that, amongst other measures, included moving the town's largest coffeeshops to the outskirts, where they continue to do business, while the city centre was freed from disturbances.

In 2001, the municipalities of Belfeld and Tegelen were merged into the municipality of Venlo. Tegelen was originally part of the Duchy of Jülich centuries ago, whereas Venlo has a past in the Duchy of Guelders. On 1 January 2010, the municipality of Arcen en Velden, was merged into the municipality of Venlo.

In 2003 Venlo was awarded the title "Greenest city of Europe". Venlo was the host of Floriade 2012, the world's largest horticultural exhibition.

In 2013, Venlo won the prestigious 'Best City Centre of the Netherlands' award. It amazed the jury by all the investments which have been made in the last couple of years in the Maas Boulevard, the railway station, the tunnel in the centre and the Maas bridge.

Culture 

Theatre "De Maaspoort"
Limburg Museum and Art Museum "Museum van Bommel van Dam"
Venlo Police Museum
Pop venue Grenswerk (formerly Perron 55)
Major annual cultural events
Carnival called "Vastelaovend" in February/March (Six weeks before Easter) 
Summer park festivities called "Zomerparkfeest" in August held in and around the main park of Venlo, a four-day podium for a broad audience, including live music, film, dance, art etc.

Education 

Venlo, being a city with a 100,000-plus population, is served by a large number of schools both at primary and secondary education levels. In addition, Venlo is a higher-education hub within the southern Netherlands, with several institutes of higher education.

Venlo hosts three institutes of higher education:

Fontys University of Applied Sciences (International Campus Venlo)
HAS University of Applied Sciences (Venlo branch)
Maastricht University Campus Venlo (University College Venlo affiliated to Maastricht University)

Transport 

Venlo is connected to Germany by two motorways (Bundesautobahn 40 and Bundesautobahn 61), which connect to Düsseldorf, Duisburg, Cologne and the Ruhr area within one hour.

Venlo railway station is a junction station. It provides regular connections to the Dutch cities of Eindhoven, Roermond and Nijmegen. Furthermore, it provides regular international connections to Germany, via Kaldenkirchen (the first stop in Germany), Viersen and Mönchengladbach to Düsseldorf and Hamm.

Sports 

VVV-Venlo is a century-old football club that plays in De Koel Stadium. Founded on 7 February 1903, it is one of the first professional football clubs in the Netherlands. In recent years it has been a yo-yo club, winning the Eerste Divisie in 2009 and 2017 and being promoted to the highest Dutch professional football league, the Eredivisie, as a result.

Geography

Climate

Economy and infrastructure 
The headquarters of multinational printing-equipment firm Océ, today a part of the Japanese firm Canon, is located in Venlo, as is the headquarters of Cimpress. Also, the European headquarters of one of the world's largest direct selling companies Amway and the American office supply retailing company Office Depot are located in the city of Venlo. In 2017 also the international onlineshop vidaXL moved its headquarters and warehouse to Venlo.

Greenport Venlo is one of designated five Greenports in the Netherlands. It is the second largest concentration of horticulture in the Netherlands. Seen in conjunction with the neighbouring German region of Niederrhein (Lower Rhine), Greenport Venlo is even the largest in Europe. Together, the Greenport area Venlo and the agro business area "Lower Rhine" in Germany form a region where more than 30 million of people live. This region is a unique and vital international network of business, research, universities and politics. The cooperation revolves around stimulating innovation, creating an attractive working and living environment and integral regional development. The network offers broad chances and future possibilities to analyse, use and further develop the "green market", thus food, fresh and logistics markets. The aim is to provide an impulse for the economy of the region of North Limburg.

International relations 

Venlo is twinned with:

Notable residents

Public thinking and public service 
 Gertruid Bolwater (died 1511), legendary Dutch folklore heroine, the Defender of Venlo
 Erycius Puteanus (1574–1646), humanist and philologist
 Henri Alexis Brialmont (1821–1903), Dutch-born Belgian military engineer
 Johan van Lom (1465–1538 or 1539), politician and philanthropist
 Willem Hubert Nolens (1860–1931), politician and Roman Catholic priest
 Charles van Rooy (1912–1996), politician, Mayor of Venlo 1952–1957
 Teun van Dijck (born 1963), politician and saxophonist, restaurateur and civil servant
 Geert Wilders (born 1963), politician, parliament member since 1998, leader of the PVV
 Jolande Sap (born 1963), politician and former educator and civil servant

Arts 

 Hubert Goltzius (1526–1583), Renaissance painter, engraver and printer
 Gerrit Gerritsz Cuyp (c. 1565–1644), Dutch Golden Age painter and master glazier
 Jan van Cleve (III) (1646–1716), Flemish painter of altarpieces and allegorical scenes
 Josephus Andreas Fodor (1751–1828), violinist and composer of the Classical era
 Carel Anton Fodor (1768–1846), pianist, conductor and composer 
 André van den Heuvel (1927 in Tegelen – 2016), actor
 Paul Cox (1940–2016), Dutch-Australian filmmaker and director
 Marie-Thérèse Schins (born 1943), German-Dutch journalist, painter and writer
 Ben Verbong (born 1949 in Tegelen), film director and screenwriter
 Geert Lap (1951–2017), ceramist and clay minimalist
 Huub Stapel (born 1954 in Tegelen), actor
 Ted Noten (born 1956 in Tegelen), conceptual artist
 Frank Scheffer (born 1956), cinematographer and producer of documentary film
 James Intveld (born 1959), American musician, singer, songwriter, actor and film director
 Will Sanders (born 1965), classical horn player, conductor and music school professor
 Pieter Kuijpers (born 1968 in Tegelen), film director, producer and screenwriter
 Glenn Corneille (1970–2005), jazz pianist
 Saskia Linssen (born 1970), model and actress, Playboy Playmate of the Month, June 1991
 Ronald Goedemondt (born 1975 in Tegelen), comedian
 Chantal Janzen (born 1979 in Tegelen), actress, singer and TV presenter
 Boris Titulaer (born 1980), soul singer-songwriter, winner of the second season of the Dutch talent show Idols
 Lotte Verbeek (born 1982), actress, model and dancer

Science and business 

 Cor Herkströter (born 1937), former chairman of Royal Dutch Shell and the ING Group 
 Chriet Titulaer (1943–2017), astronomer and TV personality
 Jo van Nunen (1945–2010), engineer and professor of logistics
 Ernst Homburg (born 1952), chemist and historian
 Evert Dudok (born 1959), President of EADS Astrium Space Transportation

Sport 

 Bart Carlier (1929–2017), football player with over 340 club caps
 Jeu Sprengers (1938 in Tegelen – 2008), chairman of the Royal Dutch Football Association (KNVB) 2002 to 2008
 Harry Heijnen (1940–2015), football player with over 400 club caps
 Theo van Vroonhoven (born 1940), field hockey player, competed at the 1960, the 1964 and the 1968 Summer Olympics
 Carla Beurskens (born 1952 in Tegelen), prominent long-distance runner
 Jan Versleijen (born 1955), professional football coach, last managed in South Africa
 Paul van der Sterren (born 1956), chess grandmaster
 Jos Luhukay (born 1963), football coach and former player
 Stan Valckx (born 1963 in Arcen en Velden), former professional footballer with 435 club caps
 David Strijbos (born 1967), former motocross F.I.M. world champion
 Inge Leurs (born 1975), former cricketer
 Rick Hoogendorp (born 1975), former football striker with 439 club caps 
 Bernard Hofstede (born 1980 in Tegelen), footballer with 380 club caps
 Sjors Verdellen (born 1981 in Tegelen), former professional footballer with 394 club caps
 Jens Janse (born 1986), footballer with 220 club caps
 Angela Steenbakkers (born 1994), handballer with the Dutch national team

References

External links 
 
 

 
Boroughs of Venlo
Cities in the Netherlands
Municipalities of Limburg (Netherlands)
Populated places in Limburg (Netherlands)
Holocaust locations in the Netherlands